Elections to Aberdeenshire Council were held on 3 May 2012, on the same day as the other Scottish local government elections. The election used the 19 wards created as a result of the Local Governance (Scotland) Act 2004, with each ward electing three or four Councillors using the single transferable vote system a form of proportional representation, with 68 Councillors being elected.

The 2007 election saw the Scottish Liberal Democrats form a coalition on the Council with the Scottish Conservative and Unionist Party.

The 2012 election saw the SNP gain an additional 6 seats and become the largest party on the Council, supplanting the Lib Dems. The Tories retained their 14 seats on the Council and as a result became the second largest party. The Lib Dems lost half their Councillors falling from 24 to 12 seats. Independents also increased their overall numbers to 11 seats while Labour and the Scottish Green Party won seats in Aberdeenshire for the first time.

Following the election a Tory-Lib Dem-Independent administration was formed and in 2013 they were joined by the 2 Labour members. On 8 June 2015, a new administration was formed by the SNP and a 'Progressive Alliance' between Scottish Labour and 2 Progressive Independent councilors, who had been members of the previous administration.

Results

Note: "Votes" are the first preference votes. The net gain/loss and percentage changes relate to the result of the previous Scottish local elections on 3 May 2007. This may differ from other published sources showing gain/loss relative to seats held at dissolution of Scotland's councils.

Ward results

Banff and District
2007: 1xSNP; 1xLib Dem; 1xIndependent
2012: 2xSNP; 1xCon
2007-2012: SNP and Con gain one seat from Independent and Lib Dem

Troup
2007: 1xSNP; 1xCon; 1xIndependent
2012: 1xSNP; 1xIndependent; 1xCon
2007-2012 Change: No change

Fraserburgh and District
2007: 3xSNP; 1xIndependent
2012: 2xSNP; 2xIndependent
2007-2012 Change: Independent gain one seat from SNP

Central Buchan
2007: 2xIndependent; 1xSNP; 1xCon
2012 2xSNP; 1xCon; 1xIndependent
2007-2012: Change: SNP gain one seat from Independent

Peterhead North and Rattray
2007: 2xSNP; 1xInd; 1xCon
2012: 2xSNP; 2xIndependent
2007-2012 Change: Independent gain one seat from Con

Peterhead South and Cruden
2007: 2xSNP; 1xLib Dem
2012: 2xSNP; 1xIndependent
2007-2012 Change: Independent gain one seat from Lib Dem

Turriff and District
2007: 1xSNP; 1xLib Dem; 1xIndependent
2012: 1xSNP; 1xIndependent; 1xLib Dem
2007-2012 Change: No change

Mid-Formartine
2007: 2xLib Dem; 1xSNP; 1xCon
2012: 2xSNP; 1xIndependent; 1xCon
2007-2012 Change: SNP and Independent gain one seat from Lib Dem

Ellon and District
2007: 2xLib Dem; 1xSNP; 1xCon
2012: 2xSNP; 1xCon; 1xLib Dem
2007-2012 Change: SNP gain one seat from Lib Dem

West Garioch
2007: 2xLib Dem; 1xSNP
2012: 1xSNP; 1xLib Dem; 1xCon
2007-2012 Change: Con gain from Lib Dem

Inverurie and District
2007: 2xLib Dem; 1xSNP; 1xCon
2012: 2xSNP; 1xCon; 1xLib Dem
2007-2012 Change: SNP gain one seat from Lib Dem

East Garioch
2007: 2xLib Dem; 1xSNP
2012: 1xSNP; 1xGRN; 1xLib Dem
2007-2012 Change: GRN gain from Lib Dem

Westhill and District
2007: 1xLib Dem; 1xCon; 1xSNP; 1xIndependent
2012: 2xSNP; 1xCon; 1xLib Dem
2007-2012 Change: SNP gain one seat from Independent

Huntly, Strathbogie and Howe of Alford
2007: 2xLib Dem; 1xSNP; 1xCon
2012: 1xCon; 1xSNP; 1xLib Dem; 1xIndependent
2007-2012 Change: Independent gain from Lib Dem

Aboyne, Upper Deeside and Donside
2007: 2xCon; 1xLib Dem
2012: 1xCon; 1xSNP; 1xLib Dem
2007-2012 Change: SNP gain one seat from Con

Banchory and Mid-Deeside
2007: 1xCon; 1xSNP; 1xLib Dem
2012: 1xCon; 1xSNP; 1xLib Dem
2007-2012 Change: No change

North Kincardine
2007: 2xLib Dem; 1xSNP; 1xCon
2012: 1xSNP; 1xLab; 1xCon; 1xLib Dem
2007-2012 Change: Lab gain one seat from Lib Dem

Stonehaven and Lower Deeside
2007: 2xLib Dem; 1xCon; 1xSNP
2012: 1xCon; 1xSNP; 1xLab; 1xLib Dem
2007-2012 Change: Lab gain one seat from Lib Dem

Mearns
2007: 2xLib Dem; 1xSNP; 1xCon
2012: 1xCon; 1xSNP; 1xLib Dem; 1xIndependent
2007-2012 Change: Independent gain from Lib Dem

Post-Election Changes
† East Garioch Cllr Fergie Hood defected from the SNP and joined the Liberal Democrats on 3 May 2013. SNP councillor in Alex Salmond's constituency defects to the Lib Dems.
†† West Garioch Cllr Sheena Lonchay and Inverurie and District Cllr Martin Kitts-Hayes both defected from the Liberal Democrats and became Independents on 25 April 2014.Lib Dems quit council group amid 'backstabbing' claims Cllr Kitts-Hayes resigned as a Councillor on 31 August 2016 citing bullying and harassment arising out of the LEGOGATE row.Councillor resigns after personal abuse claim over "Legogate" A by-election was held on 3 November 2016 and the seat was gained by Colin Clark (Conservative).
††† Troup Conservative Cllr John Duncan died on 4 September 2014.Political parties gear up for Troup by-election A by-election was held on 27 November 2014 and was gained by Ross Cassie (SNP).
†††† Huntly, Strathbogie and Howe of Alford SNP Cllr Joanne Strathdee died on 23 August 2015 after a long battle with cancer.Council HQ flags at half mast following Joanna Strathdee's death A by-election was held to fill the vacancy on 5 November 2015 and the seat was retained by Gwyneth Petrie (SNP). 
††††† Huntly, Strathbogie and Howe of Alford Liberal Democrat Cllr Alastair Ross resigned on health grounds on 1 September 2015.Voters to go to the polls in Aberdeenshire by-elections A by-election was held to fill the vacancy on 5 November 2015 and the seat was gained by Margo Stewart (Conservative).
†††††† Troup Independent Cllr Mark Findlater ceased to be an Independent and joined the Conservatives on 23 February 2016.Independent councillor joins Conservatives
††††††† Troup SNP Cllr Hamish Partridge resigned from the party on 17 June 2016 and became an Independent citing curtailments to his freedom of speech.Troup councillor resigns from SNP
†††††††† Banff and District SNP Cllr Ian Gray died on 27 August 2016 after a long illness.Tributes paid to North-east councillor who has died A by-election was held on 3 November 2016 and the seat was gained by Iain Taylor (Conservative).
††††††††† Banff and District SNP Cllr John Cox resigned from the party and became an Independent on 20 February 2017.End of the road for SNP councillor as party block his election bid

By-elections

References

External links 
Aberdeenshire 2012 election results

2012
2012 Scottish local elections
21st century in Aberdeenshire